Stoneview Nature Center is a county-operated garden and educational facility in Culver City, California along the Park to Playa Trail.

The park, which has a focus on native California and edible plantings, includes a raised-bed Mediterranean demonstration garden, a native grass meadow, and installations by the contemporary art collective Fallen Fruit. The edible landscaping includes oranges, avocados, figs, grapes, lemons, blackberries, and blueberries, and less-familiar California native edibles including lemonade berry, coffee berry and prickly pear.

Fitness equipment and workout classes are offered at the park. Stoneview is a key segment of the  Park to Playa Trail; “good views of L.A. are guaranteed on the dirt-and-paved track from Baldwin Hills to Playa del Rey.”

The center operates an apiary in partnership with HoneyLove as well as a furnishing an elaborate hotel for native bee, both as part of a public outreach campaign on the importance of pollinating insects. 

Stoneview was recommended by local public-radio station KCRW as an outdoor refuge during the pandemic.

The land was previously a primary school campus from 1956 to 2010, and was acquired by the Baldwin Hills Regional Conservation Authority in 2011.

References

Parks in Los Angeles County, California
Culver City, California
Baldwin Hills (mountain range)